Haraiki is a small atoll of the Tuamotu Archipelago in French Polynesia. It is located 42 km southwest of Marutea Nord.

Haraiki Atoll is roughly triangular in shape. It measures 7 km in length with a maximum width of 5 km. There are three islets on its reef with a total land area of about 4 km2. Its lagoon has a pass facing south.

Haraiki is purportedly uninhabited.  However, Google Maps reveals there is a small collection of buildings on the north shore (-17.446343,-143.455739) and that the bulk of the land on all three islets has been heavily planted with a grid-like patchwork of trees or large shrubs.

History
The first recorded European to sight Haraiki Atoll was Spanish navigator Domingo de Boenechea on October 31, 1772, on ship Aguila. He named this atoll "San Quintín".

Administration
Haraiki belongs to the commune of Makemo, which consists of the atolls of Makemo, Haraiki, Marutea Nord, Katiu, Tuanake, Hiti, Tepoto Sud, Raroia, Takume, Taenga and Nihiru.

References

Oceandots
Spanish voyages

External links
Atoll list (in French)

Atolls of the Tuamotus